Philodoria molokaiensis is a moth of the family Gracillariidae. It was first described by Otto Herman Swezey in 1928. It is endemic to the Hawaiian island of Molokai.

The larvae feed on Lysimachia hillebrandi. They probably mine the leaves of their host plant.

External links

Philodoria
Endemic moths of Hawaii
Biota of Molokai